Richard Torrance (14 August 1884 – 28 September 1972) was a New Zealand cricket umpire and player. He stood in one Test match, New Zealand vs. England, in 1933. He played 42 first-class matches for Otago between 1905 and 1928.

Torrance served in Europe with the New Zealand Expeditionary Force in the First World War as a private.

An accurate left-arm opening bowler, Torrance's best first-class match figures were 42–11–93–14 (7 for 51 and 7 for 42) against Hawke's Bay in the 1908-09 season, when he was the most successful bowler in New Zealand first-class cricket with 28 wickets at an average of 11.57. His best first-class innings figures were 7 for 21 against Southland in 1919-20, when he bowled unchanged through both innings, finishing with match figures of 23.3–8–41–11. He sometimes made useful runs in the lower order, as when in 1925-26 he scored 28 against Canterbury, adding 105 for the last wicket with Reginald Cherry, who was thus able to make his only first-class century. In club cricket, which he played in Dunedin until 1931, he played as an all-rounder.

Torrance umpired eight first-class matches in New Zealand between 1932 and 1938, including the First Test in 1932-33.

See also
 List of Test cricket umpires
 English cricket team in New Zealand in 1932–33
 List of Otago representative cricketers

References

External links
 
 Dick Torrance at CricketArchive

1884 births
1972 deaths
New Zealand cricketers
Otago cricketers
Cricketers from Dunedin
New Zealand Test cricket umpires
New Zealand military personnel of World War I